The 2022 United States House of Representatives elections in Kentucky were held on November 8, 2022, to elect the six U.S. representatives from the state of Kentucky, one from each of the state's six congressional districts. The elections coincided with other elections to the House of Representatives, elections to the United States Senate and various state and local elections.

District 1

The 1st district takes in Western Kentucky, including Paducah, Hopkinsville, Murray, and Henderson. The incumbent is Republican James Comer, who has represented the 1st district since 2016. Comer has most recently been re-elected in 2022, winning 74.9% of the vote.

Republican primary

Candidates

Nominee
James Comer, incumbent U.S. Representative

Withdrawn
David Sharp, former chair of the Hopkins County Republican Party (running for state representative)

Endorsements

Democratic primary

Candidates

Nominee
Jimmy Ausbrooks

General election

Predictions

Results

District 2

The 2nd district encompasses west-central Kentucky, taking in Bowling Green, Owensboro, and Elizabethtown. The incumbent is Republican Brett Guthrie, who has represented the 2nd district since 2009. Guthrie has most recently been re-elected in 2022 winning 71.9% of the vote.

Republican primary

Candidates

Nominee
Brett Guthrie, incumbent U.S. Representative

Eliminated in primary
Brent Feher
E.Lee Watts

Endorsements

Results

Democratic primary

Candidates

Nominee
Hank Linderman, nominee for this seat in 2018 and 2020

Eliminated in primary
William Compton, Plum Springs city commissioner

Results

General election

Predictions

Results

District 3

The 3rd district encompasses nearly all of Louisville Metro, which, since the merger of 2003, is consolidated with Jefferson County, though other incorporated cities, such as Shively and St. Matthews, exist within the county. Incumbent Representative John Yarmuth announced he would not be running for re-election in 2022. He was succeeded in 2022 by State Senator Morgan McGarvey, who won 62.0% of the vote in the general election.

Democratic primary

Candidates

Nominee
Morgan McGarvey, Minority Leader of the Kentucky Senate

Eliminated in primary

Attica Scott, state representative

Declined
Matthew Barzun, former U.S. Ambassador to the United Kingdom
Charles Booker, former state representative and candidate for U.S. Senate in 2020 (running for U.S. Senate)
Greg Fischer, Mayor of Louisville
Gill Holland, businessman
Aaron Yarmuth, former newspaper owner and son of U.S. Representative John Yarmuth
John Yarmuth, incumbent U.S. Representative

Endorsements

Debates and forums

Results

Republican primary

Candidates

Nominee
Stuart Ray

Eliminated in primary
Daniel Cobble
Mike Craven
Justin Gregory
Darien Moreno, tax preparer
Rhonda Palazzo
Gregory Puccetti

Disqualified
Robert DeVore Jr., former McCreary County school board member and perennial candidate

Declined
Julie Raque Adams, state senator
Michael Adams, Secretary of State of Kentucky

Results

General election

Predictions

Endorsements

Results

District 4

The 4th district is located in the northeastern part of the state along the Ohio River, including the suburbs of Cincinnati and a small part of Louisville. The incumbent is Republican Thomas Massie who has represented the district since 2012. Massie was most recently re-elected in 2022 winning 65.0% of the vote in the general election.

Republican primary

Candidates

Nominee
Thomas Massie, incumbent U.S. Representative

Eliminated in primary
Alyssa Dara McDowell
George Washington
Claire Wirth, real estate developer

Endorsements

Polling

Results

Democratic primary

Candidates

Nominee
Matthew Lehman

Endorsements

General election

Predictions

Results

District 5

The 5th district is based in the coalfields of eastern Kentucky. The incumbent is Republican Hal Rogers, who has represented the 5th district since 1981. He was most recently re-elected in 2022 with 82.2% of the vote.

Republican primary

Candidates

Nominee
Hal Rogers, incumbent U.S. Representative and dean of the House

Eliminated in primary
Richard Van Dam, physician
Jeannette Andrews, accountant
Gerardo Serrano,  farmer and activist
Brandon Monhollen, transportation manager

Endorsements

Primary results

Democratic primary

Candidates

Nominee
Conor Halbleib

General election

Predictions

Results

District 6

The 6th district is located in central Kentucky, taking in Lexington, Richmond, and Frankfort. The incumbent is Republican Andy Barr, who has represented the 6th district since 2013. Barr was most recently re-elected in 2022 winning 62.7% of the vote in the general election.

Republican primary

Candidates

Nominee
Andy Barr, incumbent U.S. Representative

Eliminated in primary
Derek Petteys, flooring contractor and candidate for U.S. Senate in 2020

Endorsements

Results

Democratic primary

Candidates

Nominee
Geoff Young, perennial candidate and assistant director

Eliminated in primary
Christopher Preece, educator

Endorsements

Results

General election

Predictions

Results

Notes

Partisan clients

References

External links
Official campaign websites for 1st district candidates
 Jimmy Ausbrooks (D) for Congress
 James Comer (R) for Congress

Official campaign website for 2nd district candidate
 Brett Guthrie (R) for Congress
 Hank Linderman (D) for Congress

Official campaign website for 3rd district candidate
 Morgan McGarvey (D) for Congress
 Stuart Ray (R) for Congress

Official campaign websites for 4th district candidates
 Matthew Lehman (D) for Congress
 Thomas Massie (R) for Congress

Official campaign websites for 5th district candidates
 Conor Halbleib (D) for Congress
 Hal Rogers (R) for Congress

Official campaign websites for 6th district candidates
 Andy Barr (R) for Congress
 Geoff Young (D) for Congress

2022
Kentucky
United States House of Representatives